Electoral district of Paddington may refer to:

 Paddington (UK Parliament constituency)
Electoral district of Paddington (New South Wales)
 Electoral district of Paddington (Queensland)
Electoral district of Paddington-Waverley